David Stanley Kernan (born 23 June 1938) is an English actor and singer, best known as an interpreter of the songs of Stephen Sondheim. 
 
He has appeared in stage musicals and was a soloist in British TV variety shows of the 1960s and 1970s including That Was the Week That Was (1962–3).

Career

Theatre
In 1970 he appeared in the original London production of the musical 1776 (musical). He played the role of Count Malcolm in the original London production of Sondheim's A Little Night Music.  In 1977 he was nominated for a Tony Award for Best Performance by a Featured Actor in a Musical for his appearance in the original Broadway cast of Side by Side by Sondheim. He also made two appearances on BBC TV's long running Edwardian Old Time Music Hall variety show, The Good Old Days, in the 1970s and 80s.

In 1986 he conceived and directed the Broadway production of Jerome Kern Goes to Hollywood, a musical revue. He also  collaborated with Dick Vosburgh and Robin Ray on a production of Noel/Cole Let's do it, celebrating the work of Noël Coward and Cole Porter. Originally a one-off production at the Barbican in aid of the Terence Higgins Trust, it later opened the 1994 season of the Performing Arts Foundation of Memphis Tennessee and ran for a season at Chichester Festival Theatre before touring.

Television
In the 1970s television period drama Upstairs, Downstairs, he played the role of Captain Charles Hammond, the young lover of Lady Marjorie Bellamy, in the episode "Magic Casements".

He also had a small but memorable role in two separate episodes of "The Avengers" - as an amateur radio enthusiast and chess player in "Never, Never Say Die," and as a shoe salesman in "Quick Quick, Slow Death."

He co-starred as Mr. Kodaly opposite Robin Ellis in the 1980s TV version of the popular Christmas musical, "She Loves Me."

Movies
Kernan also had small roles in several films, including Gaolbreak (1962), Mix Me a Person (1962), Farewell Performance (1963), Zulu (1964), Otley (1968), Up the Chastity Belt (1971) and Carry On Abroad (1972).

Filmography

References

External links
 
 David Kernan BFI

1938 births
English male musical theatre actors
English male singers
Living people
Male actors from London
English male film actors